Hester Street may refer to:

Hester Street (Manhattan), a street in the Lower East Side of the New York City Borough of Manhattan
Hester Street (film), a 1975 film based on Abraham Cahan's 1896 novella Yekl: A Tale of the New York Ghetto